Sengondo Mvungi (1952 – 12 November 2013) was a Tanzanian politician and member of the National Convention for Construction and Reform-Mageuzi (NCCR-Mageuzi).
Running as the NCCR-Mageuzi presidential candidate in the December 2005 election with the support of four other political parties, Mvungi placed fifth out of ten candidates, receiving 55819 votes (0.43%).

He died in hospital in 2013 from injuries sustained when his home in Mbezi was attacked by burglars nine days before his death.

References

1952 births
Living people
NCCR–Mageuzi politicians